"Impossible" is a song by German musician Captain Hollywood Project. It was released in October 1993 as the fourth single from his debut album, Love Is Not Sex (1993), and features vocals by singer Kim Sanders. It was a sizeable hit in several countries, but like "All I Want", it achieved moderate success in comparison with the two previous Captain Hollywood Project's singles, "More and More" and "Only with You". A music video was also produced, but it did not feature Sanders.

Critical reception
In his review of the Love Is Not Sex album, Larry Flick from Billboard wrote that "Impossible" "is another study in contrasts, as [Captain] Hollywood ponders the darkness of greed and power, amid a flurry of active, rave-flavored synth-beats. It is during this particular track that he best exhibits the poise and command of rhyme needed to resurrect the dormant hip-house movement." In his weekly UK chart commentary, James Masterton described it as "Euro-disco in the Culture Beat mould". James Hamilton from Music Weeks RM Dance Update viewed it as a "girl wailed gruffy rapped cheesy typical German techno-pop bounder". Tony Cross from Smash Hits praised the track, giving it four out of five. He wrote, "Front man Tony Dawson-Harrison [...] has come up with a monster dance hit that's impossible not to shake down to. It has the Euro flavour of hits like Culture Beat's "Mr Vain" (which Tony had a hand in) with a powered-up rap beginning. Then it grows to its hypnotic vocal chant — "I find you're a little impossible" - which is packed full of attitude. Expect it to chart very high."

Chart performance
"Impossible" was a notable hit on the charts in Europe, becoming one of the project's more successful hits. It made it to the top 10 in Denmark (9), Finland (6), Portugal (3), Spain (9) and Sweden (4), as well as on MTV's European Top 20. Additionally, the single peaked within the top 20 in Austria (15), Germany (12), Lithuania, the Netherlands (14) and Switzerland (18). On the Eurochart Hot 100, "Impossible" also was a top 20 hit, peaking at number 20 in December 1993, but on the European Dance Radio Chart, it hit number three. In the United Kingdom, it peaked at number 29 in its first week at the UK Singles Chart, on 6 February, but fared better on the UK Dance Singles Chart, reaching number 14. Outside Europe, the single was a top 10 hit in Israel, peaking at number nine.

Music video
A music video was produced to promote the song, directed by Apollon. The video did for unknown reasons not feature Kim Sanders and was later published on YouTube in March 2017. It had generated more than six million views as of December 2022.

Track listings
 12-inch single (1993) "Impossible" (New Extended Version) – 6:10
 "Impossible" (Bumpy Version) – 7:56

 CD single (1993) "Impossible" (Radio Edit) – 4:14
 "Impossible" (New Extended Version) – 6:10

 CD maxi 1 (September 1993) "Impossible" (Radio Edit) – 4:14
 "Impossible" (New Extended Version) – 6:10
 "Impossible" (Bumpy Version) – 7:56

 CD maxi 2 (January 1994)'
 "Impossible" (Red Jerry Mix) – 6:49
 "Impossible" (Red Jerry Dub) – 6:09
 "Impossible" (Kamo Flage Mix) – 6:22
 "All I Want" ('94 Club Mix) – 5:56

Charts

Weekly charts

Year-end charts

Release history

References

1993 singles
1993 songs
Blow Up singles
Captain Hollywood Project songs
English-language German songs
Kim Sanders songs
Songs written by Nosie Katzmann
Songs written by Tony Dawson-Harrison